Jõepere is a village in Kadrina Parish, Lääne-Viru County, in northeastern Estonia. It's the origin of the Loobu River.

Writer Friedrich Reinhold Kreutzwald (1803–1882) was born in Jõepere Manor.

References

Villages in Lääne-Viru County
Kreis Wierland